The EF 35-105mm lens is a family of EF mount wide-to-normal zoom lenses manufactured and sold by Canon. There were three versions made. The first version was released in 1987 as an f/3.5 - f/4.5 aperture lens. The next was released in 1991 as a f/4.5 - f/5.6 aperture lens. The last version was released in 1992 as a f/4.5 - f/5.6 USM version.

On several recent high-end Canon EOS bodies, including the EOS 7D Mark II,  EOS 5D Mark III and EOS-1D X, the f/4.5–5.6 versions of this lens are treated for the purpose of autofocus as if they were f/8 lenses, limiting AF functionality to the center point (and surrounding four points if AF Point Expansion is enabled) only. They are the only lenses without an extender attached that are treated this way.

Specifications

References

Canon EF lenses